Thomas Moses McInnis (born April 16, 1954) is an American politician. He was elected to the North Carolina State Senate in 2014. A Republican, he serves the 25th District which previously included Anson, Richmond, Scotland, Stanly and a portion of Rowan counties.  Due to the redrawing of the legislative district maps in 2018, District 25 now includes Anson, Moore, Richmond and Scotland Counties.

McInnis was born in Richmond County, North Carolina. The son of a farmer and a public-school teacher, he grew up in a modest, working-class family on a farm in Richmond County. He learned from his parents the value of a dollar, the importance of a relevant education, and how to work hard to earn a living. He put himself through school and began a business in the auction marketing industry, Iron Horse Auction Company, in 1983.  According to "The Land Report," Iron Horse Auction Company was named one of the Top 10 Auction companies in the United States in 2013.

Currently in his third term of the North Carolina State Senate, McInnis is the Chairperson of the Senate Transportation Committee for Policy and Appropriations as well as the Co-Chair of the Agriculture and Forestry Study Commission. Other committee appointments include: Commerce and Insurance, State and Local Government, Agriculture Environmental and Natural Resources, Select Committee on Prison Safety, Education and Higher Education, Appropriation and Base Budget.

Awards and Achievements:

 Richmond Community College Foundation Citizen of the Year, 2020
 The Henry W. Little, III Community Leadership Award given by The Anson County Chamber of Commerce
 Delta Waterfowl Legislator of the Year, 2017
 North Carolina Trappers Association Legislator of the Year, 2017
 NC Forestry Association Legislator of the Year, 2016
 Served 8 years on the Richmond County Board of Education
 Appointed by Congressman Robin Hayes to the 8th Congressional District Agricultural Advisory Committee
 Elected to the North Carolina Auctioneers Association Hall of Fame in 1994
 Recipient of the Prestigious National Auctioneers Association President's Award of Distinction
 Served 2 Terms on the National Auctioneers Board of Directors
 Appointed by Governor Jim Martin to serve 2 terms on the North Carolina Auctioneers Licensing Board
 Memberships and Associations: Lifetime Member and Former Consultant to the National Rifle Association, Member of the North Carolina Forestry Association
Current Political Ratings:
 North Carolina Chamber of Commerce: 100%
 American Conservative Union's Award for Conservative Excellence:  90-100%
 NC Free Enterprise Foundation:  The 6th Most Effective NC State Senator
 Civitas Action Legislation Effectiveness Rating:  90.9%
 National Rifle Association – A+ Rated

Electoral History

2022

2020

2018

2016

2014

References

|-

Living people
Republican Party North Carolina state senators
1954 births
21st-century American politicians
People from Ellerbe, North Carolina
People from Pinehurst, North Carolina